Novlene Hilaire Williams-Mills (née, Williams; born 26 April 1982), is a retired Jamaican track and field athlete. She won the bronze medal in the 400 metres at the 2007 World Championships. She is also a three-time Olympic silver medallist in the 4×400 metres relay. In 2015 she won relay gold alongside her Jamaican teammates.

Early life 
Williams-Mills was born in Saint Ann, Jamaica. She is a graduate of Ferncourt High School, located in Claremont, St. Ann Parish, Jamaica. She attended the University of Florida in Gainesville, Florida, where she was a member of coach Tom Jones' Florida Gators track and field team. She graduated from the university with a bachelor's degree in 2004.

In March 2020, Williams-Mills announced that she was pregnant with Twins.

Athletics career
At the 2005 World Championships in Athletics, she won (together with Shericka Williams, Ronetta Smith and Lorraine Fenton) a silver medal. At the 2006 Commonwealth Games in Melbourne, Australia, she received a bronze medal for her third-place finish in the 400 metres.

At the 2012 Olympic games, Williams-Mills won a silver medal in the 4×400 meter relay. She also placed 5th in the individual 400 m event.

Williams-Mills missed most of the 2013 season due to undergoing treatment for breast cancer.

During the 2014 season, Williams-Mills was very successful. Early in the season, she and three other Jamaican women won a silver medal in the 4 × 400 m relay at the 2014 world relays. Williams-Mills competed at the 2014 Commonwealth Games in Glasgow and won a silver medal in the individual 400 m and a gold in the 4 × 400 m relay, setting a games record in the latter. She was also successful at Diamond League meets, where she was crowned the 2014 Diamond League champion in the 400 m.

In 2015, Williams-Mills again won a silver medal at the world relays as part of the Jamaican 4 × 400 m team. At the 2015 World Championships in Athletics in Beijing, Williams-Mills finished sixth in the 400 m final involving four Jamaican women. In the relay, along with Christine Day, Shericka Jackson and Stephenie Ann McPherson, the individual 4th, 3rd and 5th placers, respectively, the Jamaican team won gold in front of the American favorites by just outsprinting them in the last 50 metres.

In 2016, Williams-Mills only competed in the relay at the 2016 Olympic games, running as the anchor leg for Jamaica trying to pass Allyson Felix of the US, but during the final stretch Allyson manage to hold off Novelene to get gold for the US and Jamaica got silver.

In 2017, Williams-Mills won the 400 m at the Jamaica invitational, winning in a time of 50.56.  Later on in the season, she also won the 400 m at the Diamond League meeting in Paris in a time of 51.03.

At the London 2017 World Championships, Williams-Mills made the final of the women's 400 m and came in eighth place in a time of 51.49. In the 4 × 400 m relay, which was going to be her last major championship race, she was scheduled to anchor the Jamaican team; however, on the second leg, Anneisha McLaughlin-Wilby pulled up injured, therefore ending the Jamaican team's chances of medalling in that event.

During the 2017 season, Williams-Mills announced that she would retire at the end of the 2017 season “ This is my farewell season; I’ve been in this for a long time and I think I’ve done my fair share and represented my country well so sometimes you have to hang up your spikes and move on the next chapter of your life and I think I’ve reached that point where I need to do that now", said Williams-Mills.

Her last race was on 1 September 2017 at the Brussels Diamond League, where she came 6th place running 51.27.

Cancer diagnosis
In July 2013, Williams-Mills told members of the media that she was diagnosed with breast cancer before the 2012 Olympics. Very few people at the time knew about the diagnosis. Despite the diagnosis, she still ran the race and was able to help Jamaica win a bronze medal. After the Olympics, Williams-Mills had a mastectomy and in January 2013, had another operation. She has stated that she would run, "for all the breast cancer survivors out there."

See also

 Florida Gators
 List of Olympic medalists in athletics (women)
 List of University of Florida alumni
 List of University of Florida Olympians

References

External links

 
 
 

1982 births
Living people
Jamaican female sprinters
Athletes (track and field) at the 2003 Pan American Games
Athletes (track and field) at the 2004 Summer Olympics
Athletes (track and field) at the 2008 Summer Olympics
Athletes (track and field) at the 2012 Summer Olympics
Athletes (track and field) at the 2006 Commonwealth Games
Commonwealth Games bronze medallists for Jamaica
Florida Gators women's track and field athletes
World Athletics Championships medalists
Olympic athletes of Jamaica
Olympic bronze medalists for Jamaica
Commonwealth Games medallists in athletics
People from Saint Ann Parish
Medalists at the 2012 Summer Olympics
Medalists at the 2008 Summer Olympics
Athletes (track and field) at the 2014 Commonwealth Games
World Athletics Championships athletes for Jamaica
Medalists at the 2004 Summer Olympics
Commonwealth Games gold medallists for Jamaica
Olympic bronze medalists in athletics (track and field)
Olympic silver medalists for Jamaica
Medalists at the 2016 Summer Olympics
Olympic silver medalists in athletics (track and field)
Diamond League winners
IAAF Continental Cup winners
World Athletics Championships winners
Pan American Games medalists in athletics (track and field)
Pan American Games silver medalists for Jamaica
Medalists at the 2003 Pan American Games
Olympic female sprinters
Medallists at the 2014 Commonwealth Games